Marvin the Album is the Australian folk-pop and alternative rock group Frente!'s debut album, released 24 November 1992 (26 April 1994 outside Australia), and recorded in 1992 at Platinum Studios in Melbourne, Australia. Music videos were made for the tracks " Kelly Street" [sic], "Ordinary Angels" and "No Time", each of which were also released as singles. Additional videos were made for "Lonely" and "Bizarre Love Triangle" when these tracks were appended to the international release.

Background 

Marvin the Album was the debut album by Frente! released on 24 November 1992, which peaked at No. 5 on the ARIA Albums Chart. It was produced by Daniel Denholm (Club Hoy), Michael Koppelman (Prince) and the band. The album was certified platinum in Australia. Two tracks of its tracks, "Ordinary Angels" and " Kelly Street", were placed on the ARIA End of Year Charts for 1992, at No. 20 and No. 29 respectively. At the ARIA Music Awards of 1993 the group won 'Breakthrough Artist – Album' for Marvin the Album and Breakthrough Artist – Single for "Ordinary Angels". The album was also nominated for Best Cover Art (by Angie Hart and Louise Beach) and "Ordinary Angels" was nominated for Best Video (directed by Robbie Douglas-Turner). Another single, "No Time", was released in February 1993, and peaked at No. 50 in March.

Track listing

Original release
 "Girl" (Angie Hart) - 2:42
 " Kelly Street" (Tim O' Connor) - 3:01 
 "Most Beautiful" (Simon Austin) - 2:50
 "No Time" (O' Connor) - 3:18
 "Cuscatlan" (Austin) - 2:50
 "Pretty Friend" (O' Connor) - 3:01
 "1.9.0" (Mark Picton) - 2:35
 "Reflect" (Picton) - 3:20
 "Out of My Sight" (Picton) - 3:07
 "See/Believe" (Austin, O' Connor) - 2:53
 "Labour of Love" (Austin, Hart) - 3:19
 "Ordinary Angels" (Austin, Hart) - 3:08
 "Dangerous" (Austin) - 3:02

International version
 "Girl" – 2:42
 "Labour of Love" – 3:01
 "Ordinary Angels" – 2:49
 "Lonely" – 3:23
 "Most Beautiful" – 2:50
 "Cuscutlan" – 3:00 
 "Pretty Friend" – 2:35
 "No Time" – 3:20
 "Reflect" – 3:06
 "Explode" – 2:50
 " Kelly Street" – 3:21
 "See/Believe" – 3:06
 "Dangerous" – 3:00
 "Bizarre Love Triangle" – 2:01

Differences
 "1.9.0" and "Out of My Sight" appear only on the original version
 "Bizarre Love Triangle", "Explode", and "Lonely" appear only on the international version
 The spelling of "Cuscatlan"/"Cuscutlan" is inconsistent.

"21st Anniversary Edition" (2014) 

This reissue contains all the tracks from the original and international editions, together with an additional CD of early material.

CD1
 "Girl"
 " Kelly Street" 
 "Most Beautiful"
 "No Time"
 "Cuscatlan"
 "Pretty Friend"
 "1.9.0"
 "Reflect"
 "Out of My Sight"
 "See/Believe"
 "Labour of Love"
 "Ordinary Angels"
 "Dangerous"
 "Lonely"
 "Explode"
 "Bizarre Love Triangle"

CD2
 "Love And Terror"
 "Oh Brilliance"
 "Last To Know"
 "Labour of Love" (Original)
 "Risk"
 "Baby Blue Sycophant"
 "Testimony"
 "Discipline And Deep Water"
 "Ordinary Angels" (Original)
 "Book Song"
 "Seamless"
 "Paper Bullets And Walls"
 "Nadi"
 "Somethin' Stupid (Stoopid)"
 "Blue"
 "Not Given Lightly"
 "I Will Miss You"

CD2 tracks 1–8 from the Whirled EP, 9–13 from the Clunk EP, 14–17 listed as "Rarities".

Personnel
Angie Hart - lead vocals
Simon Austin - guitar and backing vocals
 Tim O'Connor - bass guitar 
 Mark Picton - drums

Charting

References

ARIA Award-winning albums
Frente! albums
1992 debut albums
Mushroom Records albums